The qualifying rounds for the 2009 FIBA Africa Clubs Champions Cup were played in a round-robin system, in the various FIBA Africa zones, each zone qualifying two teams for the final round, played in Kigali, Rwanda.

Zone VI

See also
 2009 FIBA Africa Basketball Club Championship squads

References

FIBA Africa Clubs Champions Cup